Operación Triunfo is a Spanish reality television music competition to find new singing talent. The tenth series, also known as Operación Triunfo 2018, began airing on La 1 on 19 September 2018, presented by Roberto Leal.

In addition to the Galas or weekly live shows on La 1, the side show El Chat aired on La 1 after each weekly Gala, hosted by Noemí Galera and Ricky Merino. The activities of the contestants at "The Academy" or La Academia were streamed live via YouTube.

Famous Oberogo was announced the winner on 19 December 2018. Alba Reche came second.

As in the previous season, the series served as the platform to select the Spanish entry at the Eurovision Song Contest 2019. A special live show of Operación Triunfo 2018 was held on 20 January 2019 to select the Spanish entrant and song for Eurovision. Miki Núñez was selected with the song "La venda".

Headmaster, judges and presenter
It was announced that Roberto Leal would continue as host when the series was renewed on 28 February 2018. Noemí Galera confirmed she would continue as the headmaster of the Academy on 13 July 2018. On 23 August 2018, Mónica Naranjo announced that she would be leaving the judging panel; the same day it was confirmed that marketing director Joe Pérez-Orive and music executive and producer Manuel Martos would return as judges. On 10 September 2018, it was announced that singer Ana Torroja would join Pérez-Orive and Martos on the judging panel. As in the previous season, the three regular judges were accompanied every week by a guest panelist from the music industry.

Auditions
Open casting auditions began on 30 May 2018 in Barcelona and concluded on 10 July 2018 in Madrid. The minimum age to audition was 18.

A total of 16,769 candidates participated in the open auditions. After the open auditions, 85 candidates were called for the final closed-door auditions that took place from 28 August 2018 to 30 August 2018 in Barcelona. 18 candidates advanced to the introduction live show or "Gala 0".

Contestants
The 18 contestants that appeared on the introduction live show or Gala 0 were announced on 14 September 2018.

Galas
The Galas or live shows began on 19 September 2018. In the introduction live show or Gala 0, 18 candidates were presented to enter the "Academy." Each contestant performed a cover version of a popular song of their choice, and two of the candidates were eliminated. For the regular galas, the contestants are assigned a popular song to perform in a duet or solo. The audience votes for their favourite performer, and the contestant with the most votes is exempt for nominations. The jury panel comments on the performances and nominates four contestants for elimination. The Academy's staff meeting saves one of the nominees, and the safe contestants save another of the nominees. The two remaining nominees prepare the performance of a song of their choice each for next week's live show, where one of the contestants is saved by the audience via televote, sms and app voting. Each gala features a guest judge and guest performers.

Results summary
Colour key

Gala 0 (19 September 2018)
Musical guests: Contestants from Operación Triunfo 2017 ("Camina")

Gala 1 (26 September 2018)
Group performance: "This Is Me"
Musical guests:
Malú ("Todos los secretos")
Aitana ("Teléfono")
Guest judge: Tony Aguilar

Gala 2 (3 October 2018)
Group performance: "Bonito es"
Musical guests:
Lola Indigo ("Ya no quiero ná")
Tequila (Greatest Hits' medley)
Guest judges:
Rosana (substituting Ana Torroja)
Julia Gómez Cora

Gala 3 (10 October 2018)
Group performance: "Viva la Vida"
Musical guest: Blas Cantó ("Él no soy yo")
Guest judge: Wally López

Gala 4 (17 October 2018)
Group performance: "I Am What I Am"
Musical guests:
Mon Laferte ("Mi buen amor")
Álvaro Soler ("La cintura") (with the contestants)
Guest judge: David Otero

Gala 5 (24 October 2018)
Group performance: "Me encanta"
Musical guests:
Vance Joy ("Riptide")
Miriam Rodríguez & Pablo López ("No!")
Guest judge: Javier Llano

Gala 6 (31 October 2018)
Group performance: "Vivir así es morir de amor"
Musical guest: Tom Walker ("Leave a Light On")
Guest judge: Carlos Jean

Gala 7 (7 November 2018)
Group performance: "Don't Stop Me Now"
Musical guests:
 Eros Ramazzotti ("Hay vida")
 CNCO ("Llegaste Tú" / "Reggaetón Lento (Bailemos)")
Guest judge: Brisa Fenoy

Gala 8 (14 November 2018)
Group performance: "Enamorado de la moda juvenil"
Musical guests:
 David Bisbal & Greeicy ("Perdón")
 James Arthur ("Empty Space")
 Carlos Baute & Marta Sánchez ("Te sigo pensando")
Guest judge: Ruth Lorenzo

Gala 9 (21 November 2018)
Group performance: "Spice Up Your Life"
Musical guests:
Manuel Carrasco ("Me dijeron de pequeño")
Vanesa Martín ("Inventas")
C. Tangana & Niño de Elche ("Un veneno")
Guest judge: Pastora Soler

Gala 10 (28 November 2018)
From this week, voting for the favourite of the audience was put on hold for the final stretch of the series, and no contestant was exempt from nominations.
Group performance: "Somos" (all sixteen contestants)
Musical guests: 
Ana Belén ("Esta vida es un regalo") 
Cepeda ("Por ti estaré")
Guest judge: Paco Tomás

Gala 11 (5 December 2018)
This episode determined the first two contestants that qualified for the final. Each of the four members of the jury panel gave marks to the contestants (from 5 to 10). The contestant with the highest score was saved. The Academy's staff saved a second contestant. The four remaining contestants were up for elimination.
Group performance: "Ni tú ni nadie"
Musical guests: 
Alfred García ("De la Tierra hasta Marte")
Rosana ("En la memoria de la piel")
Guest judges:
Ana Belén (substituting Ana Torroja)
Javier Llano

Gala 12 (12 December 2018)
The episode determined the last three contestants that advanced to the final and joined the two contestants who had already qualified the previous week. The judging panel saved one of the four contestants that were up for elimination. The public saved two of the remaining three contestants in a voting window that took place during the live show. 
Group performance: "Human"
Musical guests:
Laura Pausini and Biagio Antonacci ("El valor de seguir adelante")
Ana Guerra ("Bajito")

Gala Final (19 December 2018) 
In the final, the winner of the series was decided by public vote. Each finalist performed a popular song of their choice, and after that, the first round of voting ended. The two finalists with the fewest votes were eliminated. A second round of voting began to determine the winner of the series, and the three remaining finalists performed the song they had sung on "Gala 0".
 Group performances: 
"The Edge of Glory"
"Somos" (all sixteen contestants)
 Musical guests:
 Rozalén and David Otero ("Baile")
 Pablo Alborán ("Tu refugio")
 Amaia Romero ("Un nuevo lugar")

Specials

Gala de Navidad (26 December 2018)
A Christmas special aired on La 1, where the five finalists of the tenth series performed one of the songs they had performed during the competition alongside its original artist. The special also focused on the five finalists from the ninth series of Operación Triunfo and the start of their solo careers.

Group performances (all sixteen contestants):
"Somos"
"Buenas noches"
Musical guests:
Gisela ("Amigos")
Alfred García ("Et vull veure" / "De la Tierra hasta Marte" / "Wonder")
Luz Casal ("Miénteme al oído")
Aitana ("Vas a quedarte")
Amaia Romero ("Perdona (Ahora sí que sí)")
Ana Guerra ("Olvídame")

Gala Eurovisión (20 January 2019) 

Nine of the contestants from the series performed ten original songs with the goal of representing Spain at the Eurovision Song Contest 2019. Seventeen candidate songs were assigned to thirteen of the sixteen contestants in solo and duet combinations. An online vote took place from 20 December 2018 to 2 January 2019, and the three songs with the most votes advanced to the special live show "Gala Eurovisión"; an evaluation committee selected seven additional entries from the fourteen remaining songs for the live show. During the live show, the winner was selected by public vote. In case of a tie after the regular window of voting, a second round of voting would have been opened to decide the winner.
Group performance: "Toy"
Musical guest: Eleni Foureira ("Fuego" / "Tómame")
Judges (feedback only):
Manuel Martos
Pastora Soler
Tony Aguilar
Doron Medalie

Tour
Following the finale, all 16 contestants reunited for a tour across arenas and stadiums in Spain, performing live. The tour was troubled by low ticket sales in later shows, which resulted in two shows being changed to smaller venues while the final two concerts were cancelled.

Colour key:

  Cancelled tour date

Notes

Ratings

References

External links
Operación Triunfo at RTVE.es

Operación Triunfo
2018 Spanish television seasons
2019 Spanish television seasons
La 1 (Spanish TV channel) original programming